David Herbert Fowler (28 April 1937 – 13 April 2004) was a historian of Greek mathematics who published work on pre-Eudoxian ratio theory (using the process he called anthyphairesis). He disputed the standard story of
Greek mathematical discovery, in which the discovery of the phenomenon of incommensurability came as a shock.

Fowler was also the translator of René Thom's book Structural Stability and Morphogenesis from French (Stabilité strukturelle et morphogénèse) into English.

References

 Obituary in The Guardian, 3 May 2004 by Christopher Zeeman.
 Obituary in The Independent, 24 May 2004.

External links
 Bibliography
 Book Review by Fernando Q. Gouvêa of The Mathematics of Plato's Academy
 Memorial symposium organized in his honor at Warwick, 9 November 2004.

British historians of mathematics
20th-century British mathematicians
21st-century British mathematicians
1937 births
2004 deaths
Fowler, David
Alumni of Gonville and Caius College, Cambridge
People educated at Rossall School